David Michael Smiedt (born 2 August 1968), is a South Africa-born, Sydney-based journalist, author and comedian. He has written seven books, including From Russia With Lunch: A Lithuanian Odyssey, Are We There Yet: Chasing a Childhood Through South Africa and Boom Boom: 100 Years of Australian Comedy.

Early life
David was born in Johannesburg, South Africa, and grew up in the suburbs of Parkwood and Saxonwold. David is the youngest of three children to father, Sidney Ronald "Ronnie", and mother, Renecia, with whom he emigrated from South Africa to Australia in 1986. Having completed high school in Johannesburg, David received a Bachelor of Arts (Communication) at Sydney's Macquarie University before undertaking a Diploma in Journalism at Macleay College.

Early career and journalism
He began his journalism career at Penthouse magazine and has since worked across a number of lifestyle titles, including Cleo, Cosmopolitan, Madison, Men’s Health, GQ, Sunday Life, Elle, Home Beautiful, Voyeur and The Rake. He claims to be the only journalist in history to have had concurrent articles in Ralph and Your Garden magazines.

Comedy
Described by comedian Adam Hills, host of ABC TV’s Spicks and Specks as "a living breathing joke machine", David started his stand-up comedy career at the Local in St Kilda in 2006 and has since gone on to perform at the Comedy Store in Sydney, the Harold Park Hotel, the Roxbury, the Friend In Hand, the Melbourne International Comedy Festival and the Comic Strip in New York City. He MCs one of Sydney's most popular comedy nights at the Marble Bar in Sydney's Hilton Hotel every Tuesday night.

Books by David Smiedt
 Boom Boom: 100 Years Of Australian Comedy (Hodder Headline, 1999)
 Delivering The Male (Penguin, 2000)
 Girls’ Night In: Gentlemen By Invitation (anthology) (Penguin, 2001)
 Girls’ Night In 2: Big Night Out (anthology) (Penguin, 2002)
 Prince Charming: Spot The Stayers From The Players (Landsdowne Press, 2003)
 Are We There Yet? Chasing A Childhood Through South Africa (UQP/Penguin, 2004 and Random House UK 2006)
 From Russia With Lunch: A Lithuanian Odyssey (UQP, 2008)

References

External links
 David Smiedt's official website
 David Smiedt's comedy website

People from Johannesburg
White South African people
South African expatriates in Australia
Australian people of South African descent
South African journalists
1968 births
Living people